Liverpool was a borough constituency in the county of Lancashire of the House of Commons for the Parliament of England to 1706 then of the Parliament of Great Britain from 1707 to 1800 and of the Parliament of the United Kingdom from 1801 to 1885. It was represented by two Members of Parliament (MPs). In 1868, this was increased to three Members of Parliament.

The borough franchise was held by the freemen of the borough. Each elector had as many votes as there were seats to be filled. Votes had to be cast by a spoken declaration, in public, at the hustings. In 1800 there were around 3000 electors, with elections in this seat being nearly always contested.

The borough returned several notable Members of Parliament including Prime Minister George Canning, William Huskisson, President of the Board of Trade, Banastre Tarleton, noted soldier in the American War of Independence and most notably, William Roscoe the abolitionist and Anti Slave Trade campaigner.

The constituency was abolished in 1885, the city being split into nine divisions of Abercromby, East Toxteth, Everton, Exchange, Kirkdale, Scotland, Walton, West Derby and West Toxteth.

History
The borough of Liverpool exercised the privilege of sending two members to Parliament in 1295 and 1307, but then for 240 years the right was wholly suspended. In the first Parliament of Edward VI, which met 4 November 1547, though Elective Franchise was restored to the two Lancashire boroughs of Liverpool and Wigan and has since continued almost without further interruption.

Representation was increased to three Members in 1868 and the constituency abolished in 1885, to be replaced by the nine new constituencies of Abercromby, East Toxteth, Everton, Exchange, Kirkdale, Scotland, Walton, West Derby and West Toxteth.

Members of Parliament

1295–1640

1640–1868

1868–1885

Constituency increased to three Members (1868)

Elections

Pre-1832

Huskisson's death caused a by-election.

 The by-election was declared void but no new writ was issued before dissolution

1832–1868

 

Cresswell resigned after being appointed a judge of the Court of Common Pleas, causing a by-election.

 

 

Election declared void on petition, due to bribery and treating by Mackenzie and Turner, causing a by-election.

 

Liddell succeeded to the peerage, becoming 2nd Baron Ravensworth and causing a by-election.

1868–1885
Seat increased to three members

 

Graves' death caused a by-election.

 

Ryder was appointed Vice-President of the Committee of the Council on Education, requiring a by-election.

Torr's death caused a by-election.

Ramsay succeeded to the peerage, becoming Earl of Dalhousie, causing a by-election.

Ryder succeeded to the peerage, becoming Earl of Harrowby, causing a by-election.

Notes and references
Notes

References

Robert Beatson, A Chronological Register of Both Houses of Parliament (London: Longman, Hurst, Res & Orme, 1807) 
D. Brunton & D. H. Pennington, Members of the Long Parliament (London: George Allen & Unwin, 1954)
Cobbett's Parliamentary history of England, from the Norman Conquest in 1066 to the year 1803 (London: Thomas Hansard, 1808) 
F. W. S. Craig, British Parliamentary Election Results 1832–1885 (2nd edition, Aldershot: Parliamentary Research Services, 1989)
 J. E. Neale, The Elizabethan House of Commons (London: Jonathan Cape, 1949) 

Liverpool constituency
Parliamentary constituencies in North West England (historic)
Constituencies of the Parliament of the United Kingdom established in 1295
Constituencies of the Parliament of the United Kingdom disestablished in 1885